The Isotta Fraschini Beta was an air cooled aircraft engine produced by the Italian engineering company Isotta Fraschini in the 1940s. Isotta Fraschini derived the Beta inverted 6-cylinder in-line aircraft engine from the V-12 Gamma. The engine saw limited production for aircraft, including the Nardi FN.316 and Ambrosini SAI.7, but was generally unsatisfactory in service.

Design and development
Isotta Fraschini had developed V-12 Gamma aircraft engine, which gained some success, powering the Ambrosini SAI.107 lightweight fighter. The company took essentially half of the engine and created the Beta inverted 6-cylinder in-line aircraft engine. The Beta shared the larger engine's bore and stroke. The engine had a one-piece aluminium alloy crankcase with steel and aluminium cylinders, each with a single inlet and a single exhaust valve. It had a carburettor designed by Isotta Fraschini and a single speed supercharger.

The Beta was produced in small numbers and fitted to a number of Italian training aircraft, including the Nardi FN.316 used in limited quantities by the Regia Aeronautica, Aeronautica Nazionale Repubblicana and German Luftwaffe during World War II. However, the engine was unsatisfactory in service, its failure leading to the cancellation of the IMAM Ro.63 STOL reconnaissance aircraft.

Variants

Applications

 CANSA C.6.
 IMAM Ro.63.
 Nardi FN.316.
 Ambrosini SAI.7.

Specifications

See also

References

Notes

Bibliography
 
 
 
 
 

Aircraft air-cooled inline piston engines
1940s aircraft piston engines
Straight-six engines
Beta